The New Frontiers was an American indie rock band from Dallas, Texas. Originally called Stellamaris, they released a self-titled EP in 2006, but changed their moniker after discovering that they shared a name with a long-established Israeli band. A second EP, titled Tour, followed in 2007.  The band released their only studio album, titled Mending, in 2008. The New Frontiers split up in late 2008 and played their final show in January 2009. Support at this concert came from This Will Destroy You, a band who drummer Alex Bhore has since joined.

Band members
 Nathan Pettijohn – vocals, guitar
 Ryan Henry – bass guitar
 Jacob Chaney – guitar
 Guy Turner – keyboard
 Alex Bhore – drums
 Brian Falco – guitar, keyboard

Discography

Studio albums
Mending (2008)

EPs
Stellamaris (2006)
Tour (2007)

References

External links
The New Frontiers on Myspace

Indie rock musical groups from Texas
Musical groups established in 2006
Musical groups disestablished in 2009
Musical groups from Dallas
2006 establishments in Texas
2009 disestablishments in Texas